Apsarkonda is an emerging tourist village near Honnavar, in the district of Uttara Kannada, Karnataka, India. It is situated 8 km from the Honnavar bus stand.

Etymology
Apsarkonda means Pond of Angels. This is named after a pond facing the beach. The legend associated with the name of the waterfall is that it was the chosen place of the angels to take a bath and relax.

Attractions

There is the Maha Ganapati and Ugra Narasimha temple, behind which the Apsarkonda waterfalls are found. There is a Pandava cave that is of historical significance. According to mythology, the Pandavas stayed here during their Vanavasa. There is a park near the falls maintained by the forest department. The Kelginoor lagoon near the beach is also a tourist attraction. Apsarkonda is known for its unexplored beaches.

Gallery

See also 
 Mangalore
 Karwar
Shri Karikaana Parameshwari

References

Villages in Uttara Kannada district